Live Around the World may refer to:

 Live Around the World (Meat Loaf album), 1996
 Live Around the World (Miles Davis album), 1996
 Live Around the World (Queen + Adam Lambert album), 2020